Thomas or Tom Bowles may refer to:
 Thomas Bowles (priest) (1696–1773), Church of England priest
 Thomas Gibson Bowles (1842–1922), founder of the magazines The Lady and the English Vanity Fair
 Thomas J. Bowles (American politician) (1822–?), member of the Wisconsin State Assembly
 Thomas J. Bowles (physicist), known as Tom, American nuclear physicist
 Tom Parker Bowles (born 1974), British food writer and food critic

See also
 Tommy Bowles (disambiguation)